The 1915 Oklahoma A&M Aggies football team represented Oklahoma A&M College in the 1915 college football season. This was the 15th year of football at A&M and the first under John G. Griffith. The Aggies played their home games at Lewis Field in Stillwater, Oklahoma. They finished the season 4–5–1 overall and 0–3 in the Southwest Conference.

New conference affiliation
Oklahoma A&M joined the Southwest Conference (SWC) in 1915. The Aggies were charter SWC members, along with five schools from the state of Texas (The University of Texas, Texas A&M, Baylor, Rice, and Southwestern (TX)), one from Arkansas, (University of Arkansas), and rival Oklahoma.

Schedule

References

Oklahoma AandM
Oklahoma State Cowboys football seasons
Oklahoma AandM Aggies football